Hellyeah is the debut album by American heavy metal band Hellyeah, featuring various members of Pantera, Mudvayne, Damageplan, and Nothingface.
According to MusicMight, the band finished album recordings in January 2007, and the single "You Wouldn't Know" went to U.S. radio in late February. This is the only album to feature original bassist Jerry Montano.

"You Wouldn't Know" is about the difficulty of maintaining one's integrity in the profit-obsessed music industry. "Thank You" is a tribute to all of the band's recently departed family members: Vinnie Paul's brother Dimebag Darrell, Tom Maxwell's mother, and Chad Gray's grandmother.

The album debuted at number 9 on the Billboard 200, selling 45,000 copies in its first week. As of September 26, 2007, it has sold 188,670 copies in the U.S. The album has been certified gold in the United States.

Track listing

Personnel
Hellyeah
Chad Gray – vocals
Greg Tribbett – lead guitar
Tom Maxwell – rhythm guitar
Jerry Montano – bass
Vinnie Paul – drums
Production
Produced, engineered, mixed, and mastered by Vinnie Paul and Sterling Winfield
Co-produced by Hellyeah
Additional guitar tracks recorded by Drew Mazurek

References

2007 debut albums
Epic Records albums
Hellyeah albums